Leïla Meflah (born 9 June 1982 Clamart (Hauts-de-Seine)) is an Algerian international footballer.  She currently plays as a midfielder for VGA Saint-Maur.

Football career 
Meflah trained at COM Bagneux, she began with the first team during the 2002-2003 season. In particular, contesting the D3 finals.

A regular team starter, Meflah played in the D2 competition until 2011, when she joined in the summer the Alsatian club FC Vendenheim promoted to D1 in the offseason.

Having missed the early season because of her participation in the African Games with the Algerian selection, Meflah played in the first division in the Bas-Rhin league, but disputes that are ten matches but consecutively, from the third to the twelfth day.

After one season, Meflah returned to Ile-de-France, in Saint-Maur VGA, then DH.

Meflah participates in the raising of the Val-de-Marne club in D2, with a bonus a course until 1/8 finals Cup de France.

Meflah is currently captain of the VGA.

References 

1982 births
Living people
French women's footballers
Algerian women's footballers
Algeria women's international footballers
Women's association football midfielders
French sportspeople of Algerian descent
Division 1 Féminine players